Dracula is a novel by Bram Stoker, published in 1897. An epistolary novel, the narrative is related through letters, diary entries, and newspaper articles. It has no single protagonist, but opens with solicitor Jonathan Harker taking a business trip to stay at the castle of a Transylvanian nobleman, Count Dracula. Harker escapes the castle after discovering that Dracula is a vampire, and the Count moves to England and plagues the seaside town of Whitby. A small group, led by Abraham Van Helsing, hunt Dracula and, in the end, kill him.

Dracula was mostly written in the 1890s. Stoker produced over a hundred pages of notes for the novel, drawing extensively from Transylvanian folklore and history. Some scholars have suggested that the character of Dracula was inspired by historical figures like the Wallachian prince Vlad the Impaler or the countess Elizabeth Báthory, but there is widespread disagreement. Stoker's notes mention neither figure. He found the name Dracula in Whitby's public library while holidaying there, picking it because he thought it meant devil in Romanian.

Following its publication, Dracula was positively received by reviewers who pointed to its effective use of horror. In contrast, reviewers who wrote negatively of the novel regarded it as excessively frightening. Comparisons to other works of Gothic fiction were common, including its structural similarity to Wilkie Collins' The Woman in White (1859). In the past century, Dracula has been situated as a piece of Gothic fiction. Modern scholars explore the novel within its historical context—the Victorian era—and discuss its depiction of gender roles, sexuality, and race.

Dracula is one of the most famous pieces of English literature. Many of the book's characters have entered popular culture as archetypal versions of their characters; for example, Count Dracula as the quintessential vampire, and Abraham Van Helsing as an iconic vampire hunter. The novel, which is in the public domain, has been adapted for film over 30 times, and its characters have made numerous appearances in virtually all media.

Plot 
Jonathan Harker, a newly qualified English solicitor, visits Count Dracula at his castle in the Carpathian Mountains to help the Count purchase a house near London. Ignoring the Count's warning, Harker wanders the castle at night and encounters three vampire women; Dracula rescues Harker, and gives the women a small child bound inside a bag. Harker awakens in bed; soon after, Dracula leaves the castle, abandoning him to the women; Harker escapes and ends up delirious in a Budapest hospital. Dracula takes a ship for England with boxes of earth from his castle. The captain's log narrates the crew's disappearance until he alone remains, bound to the helm to maintain course. An animal resembling a large dog is seen leaping ashore when the ship runs aground at Whitby.

Lucy Westenra's letter to her best friend, Harker's fiancée Mina Murray,  describes her marriage proposals from Dr. John Seward, Quincey Morris, and Arthur Holmwood. Lucy accepts Holmwood's, but all remain friends. Mina joins Lucy on holiday in Whitby. Lucy begins sleepwalking. After his ship lands there, Dracula stalks Lucy. Mina receives a letter about her missing fiancé's illness, and goes to Budapest to nurse him. Lucy becomes very ill. Seward's old teacher, Professor Abraham Van Helsing, determines the nature of Lucy's condition, but refuses to disclose it. He diagnoses her with acute blood-loss. Van Helsing places garlic flowers around her room and makes her a necklace of them. Lucy's mother removes the garlic flowers, not knowing they repel vampires. While Seward and Van Helsing are absent, Lucy and her mother are terrified by a wolf and Mrs. Westenra dies of a heart attack; Lucy dies shortly thereafter. After her burial, newspapers report children being stalked in the night by a "bloofer lady" (beautiful lady), and Van Helsing deduces it is Lucy. The four go to her tomb and see that she is a vampire. They stake her heart, behead her, and fill her mouth with garlic. Jonathan Harker and his now-wife Mina have returned, and they join the campaign against Dracula.

Everyone stays at Dr. Seward's asylum as the men begin to hunt Dracula. Van Helsing finally reveals that vampires can only rest on earth from their homeland. Dracula communicates with Seward's patient, Renfield, an insane man who eats vermin to absorb their life force. After Dracula learns of the group's plot against him, he uses Renfield to enter the asylum. He secretly attacks Mina three times, drinking her blood each time and forcing Mina to drink his blood on the final visit. She is cursed to become a vampire after her death unless Dracula is killed. As the men find Dracula's properties, they discover many earth boxes within. The vampire hunters open each of the boxes and seal wafers of sacramental bread inside them, rendering them useless to Dracula. They attempt to trap the Count in his Piccadilly house, but he escapes. They learn that Dracula is fleeing to his castle in Transylvania with his last box. Mina has a faint psychic connection to Dracula, which Van Helsing exploits via hypnosis to track Dracula's movements. Guided by Mina, they pursue him.

In Galatz, Romania, the hunters split up. Van Helsing and Mina go to Dracula's castle, where the professor destroys the vampire women. Jonathan Harker and Arthur Holmwood follow Dracula's boat on the river, while Quincey Morris and John Seward parallel them on land. After Dracula's box is finally loaded onto a wagon by Romani men, the hunters converge and attack it. After routing the Romani, Harker slashes Dracula's neck and Quincey stabs him in the heart. Dracula crumbles to dust, freeing Mina from her vampiric curse. Quincey is mortally wounded in the fight against the Romani. He dies from his wounds, at peace with the knowledge that Mina is saved. A note by Jonathan Harker seven years later states that the Harkers have a son, named Quincey.

Background

Author 
As the acting manager of the Lyceum Theatre in London, Bram Stoker was a recognisable figure: he would greet evening guests, and served as assistant to the stage actor Henry Irving. In a letter to Walt Whitman, Stoker described his own temperament as "secretive to the world", but he nonetheless led a relatively public life. Stoker supplemented his income from the theatre by writing romance and sensation novels, and had published 18 books by his death in 1912. Dracula was Stoker's seventh published book, following The Shoulder of Shasta (1895) and preceding Miss Betty (1898). Hall Caine, a close friend of Stoker's, wrote an obituary for him in The Daily Telegraph, saying that—besides his biography on Irving—Stoker wrote only "to sell" and "had no higher aims".

Influences 

Many figures have been suggested as inspirations for Count Dracula, but there is no consensus. In his 1962 biography of Stoker, Harry Ludlam suggested that Ármin Vámbéry, a professor at the University of Budapest, supplied Stoker with information about Vlad Drăculea, commonly known as Vlad the Impaler. Professors Raymond T. McNally and Radu Florescu popularised the idea in their 1972 book, In Search of Dracula. Benjamin H. LeBlanc writes that there is a reference within the text to Vámbéry, an "Arminius, of Buda-Pesh University", who is familiar with the historical Vlad III and is a friend of Abraham Van Helsing, but an investigation by McNally and Florescu found nothing about "Vlad, Dracula, or vampires" within Vámbéry's published papers, nor in Stoker's notes about his meeting with Vámbéry. Academic and Dracula scholar Elizabeth Miller calls the link to Vlad III "tenuous", indicating that Stoker incorporated a large amount of "insignificant detail" from his research, and rhetorically asking why he would omit Vlad III's infamous cruelty.

Raymond McNally's Dracula Was A Woman (1983) suggests another historical figure as an inspiration: Elizabeth Báthory. McNally argues that the imagery of Dracula has analogues in Báthory's described crimes, such as the use of a cage resembling an iron maiden. Gothic critic and lecturer Marie Mulvey-Roberts writes that vampires were traditionally depicted as "mouldering revenants, who dragged themselves around graveyards", but—like Báthory—Dracula uses blood to restore his youth. Recent scholarship has questioned whether Báthory's crimes were exaggerated by her political opponents, with others noting that very little is concretely known about her life. A book that Stoker used for research, The Book of Were-Wolves, does have some information on Báthory, but Miller writes that he never took notes on anything from the short section devoted to her. In a facsimile edition of Bram Stoker's original notes for the book, Miller and her co-author Robert Eighteen-Bisang say in a footnote that there is no evidence she inspired Stoker. In 2000, Miller's book-length study, Dracula: Sense and Nonsense, was said by academic Noel Chevalier to correct "not only leading Dracula scholars, but non-specialists and popular film and television documentaries".

Aside from the historical, Count Dracula also has literary progenitors. Academic Elizabeth Signorotti argues that Dracula is a response to the lesbian vampire of Sheridan Le Fanu's Carmilla (1872), "correcting" its emphasis on female desire. Bram Stoker's great-nephew, broadcaster Daniel Farson, wrote a biography of the author; in it, he doubts that Stoker was aware of the lesbian elements of Carmilla, but nonetheless notes that it influenced him profoundly. Farson writes that an inscription upon a tomb in Dracula is a direct allusion to Carmilla. Scholar Alison Milbank observes that as Dracula can transform into a dog, Carmilla can become a cat. According to author Patrick McGrath, "traces of Carmilla" can be found in the three female vampires residing in Dracula castle. A short story written by Stoker and published after his death, "Dracula's Guest", has been seen as evidence of Carmilla influence.  According to Milbank, the story was a deleted first chapter from early in the original manuscript, and replicates Carmilla setting of Styria instead of Transylvania.

Irish folklore has been suggested as a possible influence on Stoker. Bob Curran, a lecturer in Celtic History and Folklore at the University of Ulster, Coleraine, suggests that Stoker may have drawn some inspiration for Dracula from an Irish vampire, Abhartach.

Textual history

Composition 
Prior to writing the novel, Stoker researched extensively, assembling over 100 pages of notes, including chapter summaries and plot outlines. The notes were sold by Bram Stoker's widow, Florence, in 1913, to a New York book dealer for £2.2s,. Following that, the notes became the property of Charles Scribner's Sons, and then disappeared until they were bought by the Rosenbach Museum and Library in Philadelphia in 1970. H. P. Lovecraft wrote that he knew "an old lady" who was approached to revise the original manuscript, but that Stoker found her too expensive. Stoker's first biographer, Harry Ludlam, wrote in 1962 that writing commenced on Dracula around 1895 or 1896. Following the rediscovery of Stoker's notes in 1972 by Raymond T. McNally and Radu Florescu, the two dated the writing of Dracula to between 1895 and 1897. Later scholarship has questioned these sets of dates. In the first extensive study of the notes, Joseph S. Bierman writes that the earliest date within them is 8 March 1890, for an outline of a chapter that "differs from the final version in only a few details". According to Bierman, Stoker always intended to write an epistolary novel, but with an original setting of Styria instead of Transylvania; this iteration did not explicitly use the word vampire. For two summers, Stoker and his family stayed in the Kilmarnock Arms Hotel in Cruden Bay, Scotland, while he was actively writing Dracula.

Stoker's notes illuminate much about earlier iterations of the novel. For instance, they indicate that the novel's vampire was intended to be a count, even before he was given the name Dracula. Stoker likely found the name Dracula in Whitby's public library while holidaying there with his wife and son in 1880. On the name, Stoker wrote: "Dracula means devil. Wallachians were accustomed to give it as a surname to any person who rendered himself conspicuous by courage, cruel actions or cunning". Stoker's initial plans for Dracula markedly differ from the final novel. Had Stoker completed his original plans, a German professor called Max Windshoeffel "would have confronted Count Wampyr from Styria", and one of the Crew of Light would have been slain by a werewolf. Stoker's earliest notes indicate that Dracula might have originally been intended to be a detective story, with a detective called Cotford and a psychical investigator called Singleton.

Publication 

Dracula was published in London in May 1897 by Archibald Constable and Company. It cost 6 shillings, and was bound in yellow cloth and titled in red letters. In 2002, Barbara Belford, a biographer, wrote that the novel looked "shabby", perhaps because the title had been changed at a late stage. Although contracts were typically signed at least 6 months ahead of publication, Dracula was unusually signed only 6 days prior to publication. For the first thousand sales of the novel, Stoker earned no royalties. Following serialisation by American newspapers, Doubleday & McClure published an American edition in 1899. In the 1930s when Universal Studios purchased the rights to make a film version, it was discovered that Stoker had not fully complied with US copyright law, placing the novel into the public domain. The novelist was required to purchase the copyright and register two copies, but he registered only one. Charlotte Stoker, Bram's mother, gushed about the novel to the author, predicting it would bring him immense financial success; she was wrong. The novel, although reviewed well, did not make Stoker much money and did not cement his critical legacy until after his death. Since its publication, Dracula has never been out of print.

In 1901, Dracula was translated into Icelandic by Valdimar Ásmundsson under the title Makt Myrkranna (Powers of Darkness) with a preface written by Stoker. In the preface, Stoker writes that the events contained within the novel are true, and that "for obvious reasons" he had changed the names of places and people. Although scholars had been aware of the translation's existence since the 1980s because of Stoker's preface, none had thought to translate it back into English. Makt Myrkranna differs significantly from Stoker's novel. Character names were changed, the length was abridged, and it was more overtly sexual than the original. Dutch scholar Hans Corneel de Roos compared the translation favourably to Stoker's, writing that where Dracula meandered, the translation was concise and punchy.

Major themes

Gender and sexuality
Academic analyses of Dracula as sexually charged have become so frequent that a cottage industry has developed around the topic. Sexuality and seduction are two of the novel's most frequently discussed themes, especially as it relates to the corruption of English womanhood. Modern critical writings about vampirism widely acknowledge its link to sex and sexuality. Bram Stoker himself was possibly homosexual; Talia Schaffer points to intensely homoerotic letters sent by him to the American poet Walt Whitman. Stoker began writing the novel one month following the imprisonment of his friend Oscar Wilde for homosexuality.

The novel's characters are often said to represent transgressive sexuality through the performance of their genders. The primary sexual threat posed by Count Dracula is, Christopher Craft writes, that he will "seduce, penetrate, [and] drain another male", with Jonathan Harker's excitement about being penetrated by three vampire women serving as a mask and proxy for his homosexual desire. His excitement also inverts standard Victorian gender roles; in succumbing to the vampire women, Harker assumes the traditionally feminine role of sexual passivity while the vampire women assume the masculinised role of acting. Sexual depravity and aggression were understood by the Victorians as the exclusive domain of Victorian men, while women were expected to submit to their husband's sexual wishes. Harker's desire to submit, and the scene's origin as a dream Stoker had, highlights the divide between societal expectations and lived realities of men who wanted more freedom in their sexual lives. In the British version of the text, Harker hears the three vampire women whispering at his door, and Dracula tells them they can feed on him tomorrow night. In the American version, Dracula insinuates that he will be feeding on Harker that night: "To-night is mine! To-morrow is yours!" Nina Auerbach and David J. Skal, in the Norton Critical Edition of the text, posit that Stoker thought the line would render the novel unpublishable in 1897 England, and that "the America that produced his hero Walt Whitman would have been more tolerant of men feeding on men".

The novel's depiction of women continues to divide critics. Elaine Showalter writes that Lucy Westenra and Mina Harker represent different aspects of the New Woman. According to Showalter, Lucy represents the "sexual daring" of the New Woman, evidenced by how she wonders why a woman cannot marry three men if they all desire her. Mina, meanwhile, represents the New Woman's "intellectual ambitions", citing her occupation as a schoolmaster, her keen mind, and her knowledge of shorthand. Carol A. Senf writes that Stoker was ambivalent about the New Woman phenomenon. Of the novel's five vampires, four are women, and all are aggressive, "wildly erotic", and driven only by their thirst for blood. Mina Harker, meanwhile, serves as the antithesis of the other female characters, and plays a singularly important role in Dracula's defeat. On the other hand, Judith Wasserman argues that the fight to defeat Dracula is really a battle for control over women's bodies. Senf points out that Lucy's sexual awakening, and her reversal of gender-based sexual roles, is what Abraham Van Helsing considers a threat.

Race
Dracula, and specifically the Count's migration to Victorian England, is frequently read as emblematic of invasion literature, and a projection of fears about racial pollution. A number of scholars have indicated that Dracula version of the vampire myth participates in antisemitic stereotyping. Jules Zanger links the novel's portrayal of the vampire to the immigration of Eastern European Jews to fin de siècle England. Between 1881 and 1900, the number of Jews living in England had increased sixfold because of pogroms and antisemitic laws elsewhere. Jack Halberstam provides a list of Dracula's associations with antisemitic conceptions of Jewish people: his appearance, wealth, parasitic bloodlust, and "lack of allegiance" to one country. In terms of his appearance, Halberstam notes Dracula's resemblance to other fictional Jews; for example, his long, sharp nails are compared to those of Fagin in Charles Dickens's Oliver Twist (1838), and Svengali of George du Maurier's Trilby (1895), who is depicted as animalistic and thin.

The novel's depiction of Slovaks and Romani people has attracted some, albeit limited, scholarly attention. Peter Arnds wrote that the Count's control over the Romani and his abduction of young children evokes real folk superstitions about Romani people stealing children, and that his ability to transform into a wolf is likewise related to xenophobic beliefs about the Romani as animalistic. Although vagrants of all kinds were associated with animals, the Romani were victims of persecution in Europe due to a belief that they enjoyed "unclean meat" and lived among animals. Stoker's description of the Slovaks draws heavily from a travel memoir by a British major. Unlike the major's description, Harker's description is overtly imperialistic, labelling the people as "barbarians" and their boats as "primitive", emphasising their perceived cultural inferiority.

Stephen Arata describes the novel as a case of "reverse colonisation"; that is, a fear of the non-white invading England and weakening its racial purity. Arata describes the novel's cultural context of mounting anxiety in Britain over the decline of the British Empire, the rise of other world powers, and a "growing domestic unease" over the morality of imperial colonisation. Manifesting also in other works aside from Stoker's novel, narratives of reverse colonisation indicate a fear of the "civilised" world being invaded by the "primitive". What Dracula does to human bodies is not horrifying simply because he kills them, but because he transforms them into the racial Other. Monika Tomaszewska associates Dracula's status as the racial Other with his characterisation as a degenerate criminal. She explains that, at the time of the novel's composition and publication, the "threatening degenerate was commonly identified as the racial Other, the alien intruder who invades the country to disrupt the domestic order and enfeeble the host race".

Disease 
The novel's representation of vampirism has been discussed as symbolising Victorian anxieties about disease. The theme is discussed with far less frequency than others because it is discussed alongside other topics rather than as the central object of discussion. For example, some connect its depiction of disease with race. Jack Halberstam points to one scene in which an English worker says that the repugnant odour of Count Dracula's London home smells like Jerusalem, making it a "Jewish smell". Jewish people were frequently described, in Victorian literature, as parasites; Halberstam highlights one particular fear that Jews would spread diseases of the blood, and one journalist's description of Jews as "Yiddish bloodsuckers". In contrast, Mathias Clasen writes parallels between vampirism and sexually-transmitted diseases, specifically syphilis. Martin Willis, a researcher focused on the intersection of literature and disease, argues that the novel's characterisation of vampirism makes it both the initial infection and resulting illness.

Style

Narrative 
As an epistolary novel, Dracula is narrated through a series of documents. The novel's first four chapters are related as the journals of Jonathan Harker. Scholar David Seed notes that Harker's accounts function as an attempt to translocate the "strange" events of his visit to Dracula's castle into the nineteenth-century tradition of travelogue writing. John Seward, Mina Murray and Jonathan Harker all keep a crystalline account of the period as an act of self-preservation; David Seed notes that Harker's narrative is written in shorthand to remain inscrutable to the Count, protecting his own identity, which Dracula threatens to destroy. Harker's journal, for example, embodies the only advantage during his stay at Dracula's castle: that he knows more than the Count thinks he does. The novel's disparate accounts approach a kind of narrative unity as the narrative unfolds. In the novel's first half, each narrator has a strongly characterised narrative voice, with Lucy's showing her verbosity, Seward's businesslike formality, and Harker's excessive politeness. These narrative styles also highlight the power struggle between vampire and his hunters; the increasing prominence of Van Helsing's broken English as Dracula gathers power represents the entrance of the foreigner into Victorian society.

Genre 

Dracula is a common reference text in discussions of Gothic fiction. Jerrold E. Hogle notes Gothic fiction's tendency to blur boundaries, pointing to sexual orientation, race, class, and even species. Relating this to Dracula, he highlights that the Count "can disgorge blood from his breasts" in addition to his teeth; that he is attracted to both Jonathan Harker and Mina Murray; appears both racially western and eastern; and how he is an aristocrat able to mingle with homeless vagrants. Stoker drew extensively from folklore in crafting Count Dracula, but many of the Count's physical attributes were typical of Gothic villains during Stoker's lifetime. In particular, his hooked nose, pale complexion, large moustache and thick eyebrows were likely inspired by the villains of Gothic fiction. Likewise, Stoker's selection of Transylvania has roots in the Gothic. Writers of the mode were drawn to Eastern Europe as a setting because travelogues presented it as a land of primitive superstitions. Dracula deviates from Gothic tales before it by firmly establishing its time—that being the modern era. The novel is an example of Urban Gothic.

Dracula became the subject of critical interest into Irish fiction during the early 1990s. Dracula is set largely in England, but Stoker was born in Ireland, which was at that time part of the British Empire, and lived there for the first 30 years of his life. As a result, a significant body of writing exists on Dracula, Ireland, England, and colonialism. Calvin W. Keogh writes that Harker's voyage into Eastern Europe "bears comparison with the Celtic fringe to the west", highlighting them both as "othered" spaces. Keogh notes that the Eastern Question has been both symbolically and historically associated with the Irish question. In this reading, Transylvania functions as a stand-in for Ireland. Several critics have described Count Dracula as an Anglo-Irish landlord.

Reception

Upon publication, Dracula was well received. Reviewers frequently compared the novel to other Gothic writers, and mentions of novelist Wilkie Collins and The Woman in White (1859) were especially common because of similarities in structure and style. A review appearing in The Bookseller notes that the novel could almost have been written by Collins, and an anonymous review in Saturday Review of Politics, Literature, Science and Art wrote that Dracula improved upon the style of Gothic pioneer Ann Radcliffe. Another anonymous writer described Stoker as "the Edgar Allan Poe of the nineties". Other favourable comparisons to other Gothic novelists include the Brontë sisters and Mary Shelley.

Many of these early reviews were charmed by Stoker's unique treatment of the vampire myth. One called it the best vampire story ever written. The Daily Telegraph reviewer noted that while earlier Gothic works, like The Castle of Otranto, had kept the supernatural far away from the novelists' home countries, Dracula horrors occurred both in foreign lands—in the far-away Carpathian Mountains—and at home, in Whitby and Hampstead Heath. An Australian paper, The Advertiser, regarded the novel as simultaneously sensational and domestic. One reviewer praised the "considerable power" of Stoker's prose and describing it as impressionistic. They were less fond of the parts set in England, finding the vampire suited better to tales set far away from home. The British magazine Vanity Fair noted that the novel was, at times, unintentionally funny, pointing to Dracula's disdain for garlic.

Dracula was widely considered to be frightening. A review appearing in The Manchester Guardian in 1897 praised its capacity to entertain, but concluded that Stoker erred in including so much horror. Likewise, Vanity Fair opined that the novel was "praiseworthy" and absorbing, but could not recommend it to those who were not "strong". Stoker's prose was commended as effective in sustaining the novel's horror by many publications. A reviewer for the San Francisco Wave called the novel a "literary failure"; they elaborated that coupling vampires with frightening imagery, such as insane asylums and "unnatural appetites", made the horror too overt, and that other works in the genre, such as The Strange Case of Dr Jekyll and Mr Hyde, had more restraint.

Modern critics frequently write that Dracula had a mixed critical reception upon publication. Carol Margaret Davison, for example, notes an "uneven" response from critics contemporary to Stoker. John Edgar Browning, a scholar whose research focuses on Dracula and literary vampires, conducted a review of the novel's early criticism in 2012 and determined that Dracula had been "a critically acclaimed novel". Browning writes that the misconception of Dracula mixed reception stems from a low sample size. Of 91 contemporary reviews, Browning identified 10 as "generally positive"; 4 as "mixed" in their assessment; 3 as "wholly or mostly negative"; and the rest as positive and possessing no negative reservations. Among the positive reviews, Browning writes that 36 were unreserved in their praise, including publications like The Daily Mail, The Daily Telegraph, and Lloyd's Weekly Newspaper. Other critical works have rejected the narrative of Dracula mixed response. Raymond T. McNally and Radu Florescu's In Search of Dracula mentions the novel's "immediate success". Other works about Dracula, coincidentally also published in 1972, concur; Gabriel Ronay says the novel was "recognised by fans and critics alike as a horror writer's stroke of genius", and Anthony Masters mentions the novel's "enormous popular appeal". Since the 1970s, Dracula has been the subject of significant academic interest, evidenced by its own peer-reviewed journal and the numerous books and articles discussing the novel.

Legacy

Adaptations 

The story of Dracula has been the basis for numerous films and plays. Stoker himself wrote the first theatrical adaptation, which was presented at the Lyceum Theatre on 18 May 1897 under the title Dracula, or The Undead shortly before the novel's publication and performed only once, in order to establish his own copyright for such adaptations. Although the manuscript was believed lost, the British Library possesses a copy. It consists of extracts from the novel's galley proof with Stoker's own handwriting providing direction and dialogue attribution.

The first film to feature Count Dracula was Károly Lajthay's Drakula Halála, a Hungarian silent film released in 1921. Very little of the film has survived, and David J. Skal notes that the cover artist for the 1926 Hungarian version of the film was more influenced by the second adaptation of Dracula, F. W. Murnau's Nosferatu. Critic Wayne E. Hensley writes that the film's narrative differs significantly from the novel, but that characters have clear counterparts. Bram Stoker's widow, Florence, initiated legal action against the film studio, Prana. The legal case lasted two or three years, and in May 1924, Prana agreed to destroy all copies of the film.

Visual representations of the Count have changed significantly over time. Early treatments of Dracula's appearance were established by theatrical productions in London and New York. Later prominent portrayals of the character by Béla Lugosi (in a 1931 adaptation) and Christopher Lee (firstly in the 1958 film and later its sequels) built upon earlier versions. Chiefly, Dracula's early visual style involved a black-red colour scheme and slicked back hair. Lee's portrayal was overtly sexual, and also popularised fangs on screen. Gary Oldman's portrayal in Bram Stoker's Dracula (1992), directed by Francis Ford Coppola and costumed by Eiko Ishioka, established a new default look for the character—a Romanian accent and long hair. The assortment of adaptations feature many different dispositions and characteristics of the Count.

Dracula has been adapted a large number of times across virtually all forms of media. John Edgar Browning and Caroline Joan S. Picart write that the novel and its characters have been adapted for film, television, video games and animation over 700 times, with nearly 1000 additional appearances in comic books and on the stage. Roberto Fernández Retamar deemed Count Dracula—along with characters such as Frankenstein's monster, Mickey Mouse and Superman—to be a part of the "hegemonic Anglo-Saxon world['s] cinematic fodder". Across the world, completed new adaptations can be produced as often as every week.

Influence
Dracula was not the first piece of literature to depict vampires, but the novel has nonetheless come to dominate both popular and scholarly treatments of vampire fiction. Count Dracula is the first character to come to mind when people discuss vampires.  Dracula succeeded by drawing together folklore, legend, vampire fiction and the conventions of the Gothic novel. Wendy Doniger described the novel as vampire literature's "centrepiece, rendering all other vampires BS or AS". It profoundly shaped the popular understanding of how vampires function, including their strengths, weaknesses, and other characteristics. Bats had been associated with vampires before Dracula as a result of the vampire bat's existence—for example, Varney the Vampire (1847) included an image of a bat on its cover illustration. But Stoker deepened the association by making Dracula able to transform into one. That was, in turn, quickly taken up by film studios looking for opportunities to use special effects. Patrick McGrath notes that many of the Count's characteristics have been adopted by artists succeeding Stoker in depicting vampires, turning those fixtures into clichés. Aside from the Count's ability to transform, McGrath specifically highlights his hatred of garlic, sunlight, and crucifixes. William Hughes writes critically of the Count's cultural omnipresence, noting that the character of Dracula has "seriously inhibited" discussions of the undead in Gothic fiction.

Adaptations of the novel and its characters have contributed to its enduring popularity. Even within academic discussions, the boundaries between Stoker's novel and the character's adaptation across a range of media have effectively been blurred. Dacre Stoker suggests that Stoker's failure to comply with United States copyright law contributed to its enduring status, writing that writers and producers did not need to pay a licence fee to use the character.

Notes and references

Notes

References

Bibliography

Books

Journal and newspaper articles

Contemporary critical reviews

Websites

External links

 Dracula at Standard Ebooks
 , text version of 1897 edition.
 
 Journal of Dracula Studies

 
1897 novels
19th-century Irish novels
Constable & Co. books
Dracula novels
Epistolary novels
Irish Gothic novels
Irish novels adapted into films
Irish novels adapted into plays
Irish novels adapted into television shows
Invasion literature
LGBT-related horror literature
Novels adapted into ballets
Novels adapted into radio programs
Novels by Bram Stoker
Novels set in Hungary
Novels set in London
Novels set in Romania
Novels set in Whitby
Transylvania in fiction
Victorian novels
Works set in castles